Marcan may refer to:

Marcan Priority, a Biblical hypothesis
Margown, a city in Iran